The 15th/19th The King's Royal Hussars was a cavalry regiment of the British Army. The regiment was formed by the amalgamation of the 15th The King's Hussars and the 19th Royal Hussars in 1922 and, after service in the Second World War, it was amalgamated with the 13th/18th Royal Hussars to form the Light Dragoons in 1992.

History

Second World War

The regiment was created, as part of the reduction in cavalry in the aftermath of the First World War, by the amalgamation of the 15th The King's Hussars and the 19th Royal Hussars on 11 April 1922 to form the 15th/19th Hussars. It briefly dropped the 19th numeral from its title in October 1932, becoming the 15th The King's Royal Hussars, before regaining it in December 1933.

At the outbreak of the Second World War, the regiment was based at York, serving as the divisional reconnaissance regiment for the 3rd Infantry Division. The regiment was deployed with the division as part of the British Expeditionary Force, and fought in the Battle of France: it suffered heavy losses during the German advance and, having left all its armour and vehicles behind, took part in the Dunkirk evacuation.

Following the withdrawal, the regiment was assigned to the 3rd Motor Machine Gun Brigade, which was redesignated as the 28th Armoured Brigade and assigned to the 9th Armoured Division. A cadre was detached to form the 23rd Hussars in December 1940. The regiment remained in the United Kingdom until August 1944, when it moved to France to serve as the divisional armoured reconnaissance regiment for the 11th Armoured Division.

Post war
The Regiment departed Germany for Belgium in September 1945 and arrived in the Canal Zone in Egypt the following month. The regiment was assigned to the 3rd Infantry Division. It subsequently deployed to Palestine in December 1945, returning to Egypt in 1947, before onward transfer to Sudan in November 1947. It was the first cavalry regiment to be stationed in the Sudan since the 21st Lancers fought at the Battle of Omdurman in 1898. The Regiment moved to Knightsbridge Barracks in Lübeck in October 1949 and to McLeod Barracks in Neumünster in November 1951. It became the recce regiment for 7th Armoured Division and relocated to Combermere Barracks in Wesendorf in March 1953. In June 1954, it deployed to Malaya, with regimental headquarters and one squadron based at Ipoh and the other squadrons at Taiping and Raub, during the Malayan Emergency. In June 1957, a troop was deployed to Muscat during the Jebel Akhdar War. The regiment then joined 39th Infantry Brigade, moving to Lisanelly Camp in Omagh in August 1957 and then became an armoured car training regiment based at Deerbolt Camp near Barnard Castle in May 1959.

The regiment was re-roled as a nuclear escort regiment based at Swinton Barracks in Munster in September 1961 and then moved to Bhurtpore Barracks at Tidworth Camp in January 1968. It returned to West Germany in November 1969, where it joined 11th Infantry Brigade and was based at Wessex Barracks in Bad Fallingbostel. The Regiment (minus 'B' Squadron) had its first operational tour in Northern Ireland in 1971 being based at Long Kesh from August to December 1971, following the introduction of internment of Provisional Irish Republican Army suspects. From January to April 1973, 'A' and 'C' Squadrons were deployed to Northern Ireland and Lance Corporal William Stuart was awarded the Military Medal for gallantry. The Regiment was based at Lisanelly Camp in Omagh in November 1974. It then moved to a recce role, equipped with Scorpion and Fox, for 5th Infantry Brigade based at Aliwal Barracks in Tidworth Camp in May 1976; from there it deployed squadrons for the United Nations Peacekeeping Force in Cyprus. During this period, one squadron was deployed to Cyprus, equipped with Ferret Scout Cars, to serve as the resident armoured car squadron.

In September 1977, the regiment was deployed back to Germany, where it was assigned to the 3rd Armoured Division and based at Alanbrooke Barracks in Paderborn: from there it continued to send units to Northern Ireland as part of Operation Banner and undertook guarding duties at the Maze Prison. In November 1984, the main body of the Regiment returned to England as the Royal Armoured Corps Training Regiment at Bovington Camp in Dorset, although a squadron was again deployed to Cyprus, equipped with Ferret Scout Cars, to serve as the resident armoured car squadron. As part of the post-Cold War defence reforms, the regiment was amalgamated with the 13th/18th Royal Hussars to form the Light Dragoons on 1 December 1992.

Regimental museum
The regimental collection is held by the Discovery Museum in Newcastle upon Tyne.

Battle honours
The regiment's battle honours were those of its predecessor regiments plus:
The Second World War: Withdrawal to Escaut, Seine 1944, Hechtel, Nederrijn, Venraij, Rhineland, Hochwald, Rhine, Ibbenburen, Aller, North-West Europe 1940 '44-45

Commanding Officers

The Commanding Officers have been:
1959–1961: Lt.-Col. J. Michael Barton
1961–1963: Lt.-Col. A. George Lewis
1963–1965: Lt.-Col. Peter Hodgson
1965–1968: Lt.-Col. John R.D. Sharpe
1968–1970: Lt.-Col. John C.F. Inglis
1970–1973: Lt.-Col. J. Simon F. Murray
1973–1976: Lt.-Col. Richard A. Coxwell-Rogers
1976–1978: Lt.-Col. Rupert H.G. McCarthy
1978–1980: Lt.-Col. C. Anthony G. Wells
1980–1983: Lt.-Col. James S. Knox
1983–1985: Lt.-Col. Peter V. Hervey
1985–1988: Lt.-Col. D. Stewart Balmain
1988–1991: Lt.-Col. Tresham D. Gregg
1991–1992: Lt.-Col. Christopher H. Braithwaite

Colonels-in-Chief
1922 Queen Alexandra
1958 The Princess Margaret, Countess of Snowdon, CI, GCVO

Regimental Colonels
Colonels of the Regiment were:
1922–1931: Gen. Sir William Eliot Peyton, KCB, KCVO, DSO ( ex 15th Hussars)
1922–1925: F.M. Sir John Denton Pinkstone French, 1st Earl of Ypres, KP, GCB, OM, GCVO, KCMG (ex 19th Hussars)
1931–1944: Brig-Gen. Anthony Courage, DSO, MC
1944–1947: F.M. Sir Philip Walhouse Chetwode, Bt., 1st Baron Chetwode, GCB, OM, GCSI, KCMG, DSO
1947–1957: Brig. Sir Henry Robert Kincaid Floyd, Bt., CB, CBE
1957–1964: Maj-Gen. Sir William Robert Norris Hinde, KBE, CB, DSO
1964–1970: Col. Anthony Donnithorne Taylor, DSO, MC
1970–1978: Maj-Gen. Francis Brian Wyldbore-Smith, CB, DSO, OBE
1978–1983: Lt-Col. Peter Hodgson
1983–1988: Brig. John Rowe Dutton Sharpe, CBE
1988–1992: Lt-Col. Richard Annesley Coxwell-Rogers, DL
''1992: Regiment amalgamated with 13th/18th Royal Hussars (Queen Mary's Own), to form The Light Dragoons

Notable soldiers
The following are notable former members of the regiment:
Major General Sir Michael Creagh (1892–1970), former General Officer Commanding 7th Armoured Division
Brigadier Sir Henry Floyd (1899–1968), former Chief-of-Staff of the Eighth Army
Major Ian Gow (1937–1990), former Treasury Minister assassinated by the IRA
Brigader Viscount Head (1906–1983), former Secretary of State for War
Colonel Sir Walter Luttrell (1919–2007), former Lord Lieutenant of Somerset
Captain Gerald Maitland-Carew (born 1941), current Lord Lieutenant of Roxburgh, Ettrick and Lauderdale
Lieutenant General Simon Mayall (born 1956), former Deputy Chief of the Defence Staff
Captain Lord Peyton (1919–2006), former Minister of Transport
Captain Harry Woolf, Baron Woolf (born 1933), former Lord Chief Justice of England and Wales

In popular culture
"A" Squadron of the 15th/19th Hussars appears in Episode 4 "Replacements" of the TV miniseries Band of Brothers during the assault on Nuenen.

References

Sources
 

15 The King's Royal Hussars
Hussar regiments of the British Army
Hussars
Military units and formations established in 1922
King's Royal Hussars 015 019